Kalashoka or Kakavarna was the son and successor of Shishunaga. 
He divided his kingdom between his ten sons and crowned his ninth son, Nandivardhana as the king of Magadha.

Reign
Shishunaga had transferred the capital of Magadha to Vaishali. Kalashoka succeeded his father Shishunaga. Kalashoka again transferred the capital to Pataliputra.

According to Buddhist literature, the Second Buddhist Council, held 100 years after the Maha Parinirvana of Lord Buddha, in Vaishali, was patronised by King Kalashoka. But despite King Kalashoka's best efforts, differences among the Buddhists persisted. He divided his kingdom between his ten sons, who ruled simultaneously.

References

Citations

Sources
 
 
 

4th-century BC Indian monarchs
Kings of Magadha